The Seaboard Air Line Railroad’s Main Line was the backbone of the Seaboard Air Line Railroad's network in the southeastern United States.  The main line ran from Richmond, Virginia to Tampa, Florida, a distance of over 800 miles.  Along its route it passed through Petersburg, Raleigh, Columbia, Savannah, Jacksonville, and Ocala, Florida.  While some segments of the line have been abandoned as of 2022, most of the line is still in service and is owned by the Seaboard Air Line's successor, CSX Transportation as their S Line.

History
By the time the Seaboard Air Line Railroad (known as the Seaboard Air Line Railway before 1946) was officially created, track that would make up its main line had already been built by the company's predecessors.  The main line was built in the late 1800s by the following companies:
Richmond, Petersburg and Carolina Railroad, Richmond, Virginia to Norlina, North Carolina
Raleigh and Gaston Railroad, Norlina to Raleigh, North Carolina
Raleigh and Augusta Air Line Railroad, Raleigh to Hamlet, North Carolina
Palmetto Railroad, Hamlet to Cheraw, South Carolina
Chesterfield and Kershaw Railroad, Cheraw to Camden, South Carolina
Predecessors of the Florida Central and Peninsular Railroad:
South Bound Railroad, Camden to Savannah, Georgia
Florida Central and Peninsular Railroad Northern Division, Savannah to Georgia/Florida state line
Florida Northern Railroad, state line to Yulee, Florida
Fernandina and Jacksonville Railroad, Yulee to Jacksonville, Florida
Florida, Atlantic and Gulf Central Railroad, Jacksonville to Baldwin, Florida
Florida Railroad, Yulee to Baldwin to Waldo, Florida
Florida Transit and Peninsular Railroad Tampa Division, Waldo to Tampa, Florida

By 1900, the Seaboard Air Line Railway was incorporated, which brought together the predecessor companies together and created the main line north of Camden, South Carolina.  At this time, the company had leased the Florida Central and Peninsular Railroad (FC&P) network which expanded the system through Georgia and Florida.  The Seaboard Air Line would fully not own the FC&P network until 1903.

The Seaboard Air Line would run many historic passenger services over its main line, many of which ran from New York to Florida.  Some of the Seaboard's passenger trains included the Florida and Metropolitan Limited, Atlanta Special, Suwanee River Special, Orange Blossom Special, Southern States Special, Cotton Blossom, Palmland, Silver Meteor, Silver Comet, Silver Star, Sunland, and Tidewater.

Seaboard also had a number of fast, high-priority freight trains called Red Ball freights between various points on its system. However, from 1918 to 1966, a number of through freight trains instead ran the Andrews and Charleston Subdivisions between Hamlet, North Carolina and Savannah, Georgia to allow passenger trains to be prioritized on the main line.

The Seaboard Air Line installed Centralized traffic control along the main line in the 1940s to improve efficiency.  The Seaboard Air Line would also be the first railroad to install a talking hot box detector (the predecessor to the modern defect detector).  This first talking hot box detector was installed on the main line in Riceboro, Georgia.

In 1967, the Seaboard Air Line merged with their long-time rival, the Atlantic Coast Line Railroad (ACL). The ACL also had a main line running from Richmond, Virginia to Tampa, Florida that was roughly parallel to the SAL’s main line.  The two main lines crossed each other in Chester, Savannah, Jacksonville, and Plant City.  After the merger was complete, the company was named the Seaboard Coast Line Railroad (SCL), who largely retained both main lines in the combined network.  To differentiate the two main lines, the Seaboard Coast Line designated the SAL’s main line as the S Line and the ACL’s main line as the A Line.  The letter S was added as a prefix to the mileposts on the S Line (S was also added to the beginning of the pre-existing letter prefixes on the SAL’s branch lines).

In 1980, the Seaboard Coast Line's parent company merged with the Chessie System, creating the CSX Corporation.  The CSX Corporation initially operated the Chessie and Seaboard Systems separately until 1986, when they were merged into CSX Transportation.

Current conditions
As of 2022, much of the line is still in service, though it has been abandoned in some places.

At the north end, CSX still operates the line from Richmond to just north of Chester, which is now CSX's Bellwood Subdivision.
The short segment of the S Line from Centralia (just north of Chester, Virginia) to Collier Yard (just south of Petersburg, Virginia) was abandoned by the Seaboard Coast Line shortly after the 1967 merger.  The remaining track was connected to the A Line in an effort to consolidate the two lines on to the A Line though Petersburg.  Some of the supports that once held the S Line's bridge over the Appomattox River are still standing on the northwest side of Petersburg.

CSX abandoned the S Line from Collier Yard to Norlina, North Carolina in 1987.  CSX sold the right of way to the states of Virginia and North Carolina in 2019.  The states are doing preliminary work to rebuild the line for high-speed passenger service as part of the Southeast High Speed Rail Corridor.
  
The S Line is still in service from Norlina, North Carolina to Savannah, Georgia.  This segment is now CSX's Norlina Subdivision, Aberdeen Subdivision, Hamlet Subdivision, Columbia Subdivision, and Savannah Subdivision.  Amtrak still operates on this segment from Raleigh to Savannah.  This is the only segment of the S Line that still carries regular passenger service.

From Savannah to the Ogeechee River in Richmond Hill, Georgia, the line was abandoned and consolidated with the A Line shortly after the 1967 merger.  Though, the original S Line bridge over the Ogeechee River still stands with its tracks removed next to the A Line bridge.

The S Line was severed as a through route between Savannah and Jacksonville in 1986 when track was abandoned between Riceboro, Georgia and Bladen, Georgia.  Additional track was abandoned between Bladen and Seals, Georgia four years later.
The shortline Riceboro Southern Railway now operates from Richmond Hill to Riceboro, and the First Coast Railroad operates from Seals, Georgia to Yulee, Florida.  Both the First Coast Railroad and the Riceboro Southern Railway took over their respective sections of the S Line in the mid 2000s and are both owned by Genesee & Wyoming.  South of Yulee to Panama Park near Jacksonville is now CSX's Kingsland Subdivision.  The S Line Urban Greenway is now on the former right of way in northeast Jacksonville.

The S Line in Florida is CSX's primary freight route through peninsular Florida.  From Jacksonville to Baldwin, the S Line run through CSX's Jacksonville Terminal Subdivision and runs on the Wildwood Subdivision from Baldwin to Owensboro.  A short section of the S Line from Owensboro to Zephyrhills was abandoned by the Seaboard Coast Line shortly after the 1967 merger, which was consolidated with nearly ex-ACL lines.  The Hardy Trail was built on some of the former right of way near Dade City in 2019.  From Zephyrhills to Gary in Tampa is now CSX's Yeoman Subdivision and part of the Tampa Terminal Subdivision.  The S Line has been abandoned beyond Gary, which has severed the line from Tampa Union Station.

Historic Stations

References

Seaboard Air Line Railroad